New Hampshire Route 121 (abbreviated NH 121) is a  north–south state highway in Rockingham and Hillsborough counties in southeastern New Hampshire. The road winds through the communities of Atkinson, Hampstead, Sandown, Derry, Chester, and Auburn. The southern terminus of NH 121 is at the Massachusetts state line in Plaistow, where the road, named Atkinson Depot Road, continues into the city of Haverhill as an unnumbered local road (North Main Street) leading to Route 125. The northern terminus is at a traffic circle, where NH 121 meets New Hampshire Route 28 Bypass (the Londonderry Turnpike) in eastern Manchester. At this point, the road is known as Manchester Road.

Major intersections

Suffixed routes

The southern terminus of NH 121A is at the Massachusetts state line in Plaistow, where the road continues for approximately 87 yards (80 m) into Massachusetts before ending at Massachusetts Route 125, a continuation of New Hampshire Route 125 in Haverhill. Upon crossing the border, NH 121A becomes Main Street, reflecting its status as the main street of Plaistow.

The northern terminus of NH 121A is in the town of Chester at New Hampshire Route 121.

References

External links

 New Hampshire State Route 121 on Flickr
 New Hampshire State Route 121A on Flickr

121
Transportation in Rockingham County, New Hampshire
Transportation in Hillsborough County, New Hampshire